J20 Regional is the 2nd tier junior ice hockey league in Sweden composed of 36 teams in 4 regional divisions (Norra (Northern), Östra (Eastern), Västra (Western) and Södra (Southern)).

Format

The regular season is played in the divisional format from mid September until the beginning of March, at that time the top team in each of the 4 divisions play in the Play off to J20 Nationell against the bottom 2 Nationell teams. The top 2 teams in the play off play the next season in J20 Nationell, the other 4 teams will play in J20 Regional.

Teams

Results

The top teams from each division play in a Promotion and relegation series with the bottom 2 teams from J20 Nationell to determine promotions/relegations.  The below table shows the promotions and relegation's from and to J20 Regional.

References
 Eliteprospects.com J20 Elit 
 eurohockey.com J20 Elit info
 J20 Elit Södra 
 J20 Elit Västra
 J20 Elit Östra
 J20 Elit Norra

Junior ice hockey in Sweden
Ice hockey leagues in Sweden